Methaneseleninic acid (methylseleninic acid or MSA) is a seleninic acid with the chemical formula CH3SeO2H.

Preparation
Methaneseleninic acid is conveniently synthesized through oxidation (3% hydrogen peroxide) of commercially available dimethyl diselenide.
MeSeSeMe + H2O2  →  2 MeSeO2H

Seleninic acids can be prepared by oxidation of selenoesters with one equivalent of dimethyldioxirane (DMDO). Use of excess DMDO affords little studied selenonic acids (RSeO3H).

RSeC(O)R'  +  DMDO →  RSeO2H
RSeC(O)R'  +  excess DMDO →  RSeO3H

Selenenic acids, formed during the syn-elimination of selenoxides, undergo spontaneous disproportionation into the corresponding seleninic acids and diselenides:
2 RSeOH  →  RSeO2H  +  1/2 RSeSeR

Structure, bonding, properties
Methaneseleninic acid, from decomposition of Se-methylselenocysteine Se-oxide but also available commercially, has been characterized by X-ray crystallography. The configuration about the selenium atom is pyramidal, with Se-C = 1.925(8) Å, Se-O = 1.672(7) Å, Se-OH = 1.756(7) Å, the angle OSeO = 103.0(3)°, the angle HO-Se-C = 93.5(3)°, and the angle OSeC = 101.4(3)°. The structure is isomorphous to that of methanesulfinic acid  Optical isomers of methaneseleninic acid can be isolated as chiral crystals by recrystallization from a mixture of methanol and toluene.  The absolute configuration of one of the enantiomers was determined by X-ray crystallography. Optically active methaneseleninic acid was stable toward racemization in the solid state, although it racemized very rapidly in solution.

Anticancer activity
Methaneseleninic acid shows potential anticancer activity and is a model for studying the anticancer effects of selenium in vitro. Methaneseleninic acid shows superior in vivo inhibitory efficacy toward human prostate cancer compared to selenomethionine or selenite (ion). It has recently been reported that methaneseleninic acid enhances the efficacy of paclitaxel for treatment of triple-negative breast cancer, that methaneseleninic acid functions as an aromatase inhibitor, of possible use in therapy for estrogen receptor-positive breast cancer in postmenopausal women, that methaneseleninic acid shows promise as a sensitizing agent for apoptosis induced by the Bcl-2-family inhibitor ABT-737 in  several cancer lines, and that methaneseleninic acid restricts tumor growth in the nude mouse model of metastatic breast cancer and Lewis lung carcinoma in mice.

Methaneselenol (CH3SeH) can be produced in vivo by reduction of methaneseleninic acid and may in fact be the key metabolite responsible for selenium’s anticancer activity through generation of superoxide. The reduction of methaneseleninic acid by mammalian thioredoxin reductase has been studied.

References

Organoselenium compounds
Organic acids
Selenium(II) compounds